KKFX-CD (channel 24) is a low-power, Class A television station licensed to San Luis Obispo, California, United States, serving the Central Coast of California as an affiliate of the Fox network. It is owned by the News-Press & Gazette Company (NPG) alongside Santa Barbara–licensed ABC/CBS affiliate KEYT-TV (channel 3); NPG also provides certain services to Santa Maria–licensed Telemundo affiliate KCOY-TV (channel 12) under a shared services agreement (SSA) with owner VistaWest Media, LLC. KKFX-CD and KCOY-TV share studios at West McCoy Lane and Skyway Drive in Santa Maria north of Santa Maria Public Airport; KEYT-TV maintains separate facilities on Miramonte Drive on TV Hill, overlooking downtown Santa Barbara. KKFX-CD's transmitter is located near Serrano and US 101 in the Los Padres National Forest. The station can be seen on channel 11 on most cable systems in the market, hence the Fox 11 branding.

Although KKFX-CD identifies as a station in its own right, it is officially licensed as a translator of KCOY-TV. In addition to its own digital signal, KKFX-CD is simulcast in high definition on KCOY-TV's second digital subchannel from a transmitter on Tepusquet Peak in the Los Padres National Forest east of Santa Maria. KCOY-TV, in turn, is simulcast on KKFX-CD's second digital subchannel.

History
KKFX-CD signed on for the first time on November 6, 1998 as the area's Fox affiliate. Network-owned West Coast flagship station KTTV in Los Angeles (which had been carried on cable throughout the Central Coast dating back to its days as a superstation) served as the affiliate of record for the Central Coast before the station began operations. Before July 1, 2006, this station could also be seen in Santa Barbara on KSBB-LP channel 17, but it switched to a repeater of KEYT-TV. On April 20, 2007, Clear Channel Communications entered into an agreement to sell its television station group to Providence Equity Partners. The sale was finalized on March 14, 2008. However, Providence Equity Partners did not keep KKFX and sister station KCOY due to Federal Communications Commission (FCC) restrictions. As a result, they were resold to the Cowles Publishing Company. On May 7, 2008, the deal between Cowles and Newport Television closed.

On September 20, 2013, News-Press & Gazette Company, owner of KEYT-TV in Santa Barbara, announced that it would purchase KKFX-CA as well as Monterey sister stations KION-TV and KMUV-LP. NPG also took over some operations of KCOY that Cowles retained under a shared services agreement. The sale was completed on December 13, 2013.

On January 20, 2015, KKFX began broadcasting over the air in high definition and providing an HD feed directly to cable and DirecTV. On that same date, KKFX-CA returned to the airwaves in Santa Barbara on low-power KSBB-CD channel 17.

Newscasts
Fox 11 News in the Morning airs weekdays on KKFX from 7 a.m. to 8 a.m. A nightly hour-long newscast is included.

Subchannels
The station's digital signal is multiplexed:

See also
Channel 11 branded TV stations in the United States
Channel 24 low-power TV stations in the United States

References

External links
Official website

KFX-CD
Television channels and stations established in 1998
1998 establishments in California
News-Press & Gazette Company
Low-power television stations in the United States
Fox network affiliates
Grit (TV network) affiliates